Wang Xiaohua (born 15 April 1993) is a Chinese handball goalkeeper for Jiangsu and the Chinese national team.

She represented China at the 2013 World Women's Handball Championship in Serbia, where the Chinese team placed 18th.

References

Chinese female handball players
1993 births
Living people